The Blame It On Bianca Del Rio Tour (2017–18) was the drag queen Bianca Del Rio's third solo worldwide comedy tour. Starting from Auckland in early November the season 6 winner of RuPaul's Drag Race played sold-out shows across six continents. The tour was the comedienne's first visit to South Africa and Asia.

Tour Dates

References

Comedy tours